Nephele densoi is a moth of the family Sphingidae. It is known from Madagascar and the Comoro Islands.

The larvae feed on Nerium oleander, Ficus benghalensis and Ficus reflexa.

References

Nephele (moth)
Moths described in 1870
Moths of Madagascar
Moths of the Comoros
Moths of Réunion